Tinzaouaten (var. Tinzawatene and Tin-Zaouatene, Arabic: تين ظواتين) is a Saharan rural commune in the far northeast of Mali on the Algerian border. The commune is in the Abeïbara Cercle of the Kidal Region. It included a stop on a trans-Saharan trade route and a military post on the frontier under the French colonial regime. In 2009 the 8,000 square kilometer commune had a population of 2,300, most of whom are nomadic Tuareg. The Algerian settlement of Tinzaouten is on the Algerian side of the border.

References

External links
 Le CARI (Centre d'Actions et de Réalisations Internationales), PAADAP Programme Agroecologique d'Appui au Developpement Agricole et Pastoral commune de Tin Zaouaten Adrar Des Iforas, Republique du Mali.

Populated places in Kidal Region
Tuareg